Reza Beiranvand (born 1 April 1997) wrongly known as Reza Beiralvand is an Iranian weightlifter.

He participated at the 2018 World Weightlifting Championships, winning a medal.

Major results

References

External links
 
 

1997 births
Living people
Iranian male weightlifters
World Weightlifting Championships medalists
Weightlifters at the 2014 Summer Youth Olympics
21st-century Iranian people
Islamic Solidarity Games competitors for Iran